or  refers to a prescribed method of laying a curse upon a target that is traditional to Japan, so-called because it is conducted during the hours of the Ox (between 1 and 3 AM). In the modern-day common conception, the nails are driven through a straw effigy of the victim, impaled upon the tree behind it. The ritual must be repeated seven days running, after which the curse is believed to succeed, causing death to the target, but being witnessed in the act is thought to nullify the spell. The Kifune Shrine in Kyoto is famously associated with the ritual.

Overview

Sources say that common method of the ritual developed during the Edo period (1603–1868).

The woman performing the curse is generally portrayed as dressed in white, with disheveled hair, wearing an iron "crown" that holds three burning candles, suspending (from her neck) a mirror upon her chest (which lies hidden) and wearing a pair of tall clogs (geta).

It was believed that the spot struck on the straw doll corresponded to the area of the body where the target would begin to experience illness or injury. However, this straw doll or other form of effigy was not a definitive requisite in the ritual even relatively late in the Edo Period. For instance, in Toriyama Sekien's  Konjaku Gazu Zoku Hyakki (1779, pictured top right) depicts the woman holding a hammer but no doll, nor is the doll mentioned in the caption. In this case, the nails are driven directly into the branches of the sacred tree.

The props used are described somewhat differently, depending on the source. Nails of a particular size called  are prescribed according to some authorities. She may hold in her mouth a comb, or a "torch of bamboo and pine roots lighted at both ends". The "proper witching hour" is, strictly speaking, the ushi no mitsu doki (2:00–2:30 am).

In Sekien's or Hokusai's print (above), the woman performing the curse ritual is depicted with a black ox by her side. Such a black ox, lying recumbent, is expected to appear on the seventh night of the ritual, and one must stride or straddle over the animal to complete the task to success, but if one betrays fear at the ox's apparition the "potency of the charm is lost".

History

In earlier times, the term simply referred to worshiping at the shrine during the hours of the ox, and the curse connotation developed later. At the Kifune Shrine in Kyoto, there was a tradition that if one prayed here on the "ox hour of the ox day of the ox month of the ox year" the wish was likely to be granted, because it was during this alignment of the hour, day, month, and year that the Kibune deity was believed to have made descent upon the shrine. However, the shrine became known a cursing spot in later development.

The Kibune Shrine became strongly associated with the ox hour curse following the fame of the medieval legend of the Hashihime of Uji ("The Princess of the "). The legend is considered the prime source of the later conception Ushi no toki mairi curse ritual. According to legend, Hashihime in mortal life was the daughter of a certain nobleman, but consumed by jealousy, made a wish to become a kijin (an oni demon) capable of destroying her love rival. After  7 days at Kifune Shrine, she was finally given revelation by the resident deity "to bathe for thirty seven days in the rapids of the Uji River." Note that even though Kibune has later been seen as a mecca for the ritual, Hashihime only learned the recipe here, and enacted it miles away (Kifune is in the north of Kyoto, the Uji River is to the south).

The earliest written text of the legend occurs in a late Kamakura-period variant text (Yashirobon codex) of The Tale of Heike, under the Tsurugi no maki ("Book of the Sword") chapter. According to it, Hashihime was originally a mortal during the reign of Emperor Saga (809 to 823), but after turning demon and killing her rival, her man's kinsmen, then indiscriminately other innocent parties, she lived on beyond the normal human life span, to prey on the samurai Watanabe no Tsuna at the  bridge, only to have her arm severed by the sword . Tsuna kept the demon's arm, whose power was contained by the  Abe no Seimei, via chanting the Ninnō-kyō sutra. In this variant of the "chapter of the sword",  the ceremony that the woman undergoes at the Uji River to transmogrify into the demon is described as follows:

Secluding herself in a deserted spot, she divided her long hair into five bunches and fashioned these bunches into horns. She daubed her face with vermilion and her body with cinnabar, set on her head an iron tripod with burning brands [* ] attached to its legs and held in her mouth  another brand, burning at both ends. 

Thus in the Tsurugi no maki can be seen such elements as the wearing of the tripod (here called ) and propping lit torches (similar to candles in later tradition), but the woman painted her entire face and body red, rather than remain in pure white garb.

Later during the Muromachi period, this legend was adapted by Zeami into the Noh play Kanawa or "The Iron Crown". The Noh play inherits essentially the same outfit for the principal woman, who is commanded by the oracle to  "daub your face with red and wear scarlet clothing," and uses neither a straw doll or hammer, but has the yingyang master Seimei creates "two life-size straw effigies of the man and his new wife [with] their names [placed] inside" in order to perform the rites to excorcize Hashihime's demon. Therefore, the later form of the ushi no mairi developed afterwards, .

Curse using dolls in antiquity 
The use of dolls in the cursing ritual has been practiced since antiquity, with a reference in the Nihon Shoki chronicle under the reign of Emperor Yōmei, which relates that in the year 587, Nakatomi no Katsumi no Muraji "preparede figures of the  ... and [spellcast] them", but it did not work. However, this record does not clarify if the dolls were poked by sharp implements.

There are unearthed archeological relics shaped like human dolls suspected of being used in curses. Called , some have faces realistically drawn and ink, and others with iron nails driven into the breast. One such from the 8th century is held by the Nara National Research Institute for Cultural Properties. Another from the Tatechō site in Matsue, Shimane, a wooden tag depicts a female figure, apparently a noblewoman deducing from attire, and this doll had three wooden pegs or nails driven into it, aiming at her breasts and her heart.

Miscellaneous 
 In Japanese law studies, attempts to commit murder through the ushi no mairi is often cited as the "textbook example of impossibility defense case crime".

Popular art 
 A once common design archetype to those interested in ghosts and the occult in anime and manga involves such characters wearing lit candles held upright aside their front crown of their head rather with a makeshift headband made of rope or another sturdy material.
 The film Kanawa (1969) is based on the Noh play.
 In the video Game Final Fantasy Crystal Chronicles: The Crystal Bearers, one variety of Tonberry uses a hammer and nail to control a much larger nail that will chase after and attack the player character Layle.
 In the video Game series Pokémon, there is a ghost-type attack used by Pokémon called Curse. The attack animation involves hammering a nail onto themselves and losing 50% their health. The opposing Pokémon is then "cursed" and loses 25% of their health every turn regardless if the Pokémon that afflicted the Curse faints. 
 The character, Nobara Kugisaki from the manga, Jujutsu Kaisen is skilled in combat using a straw doll, a hammer and nails which she learned from her grandmother.
 The character Soichi Tsujii from the manga Junji Ito Collection used this way to curse people.
 The Curse Devil from the manga Chainsaw Man can be summoned through the use of nails or something that resembles them (i.e. a spike-like sword), after its victim is "nailed" three times, the devil will appear and finish them off.

See also
Witching hour
Shintai
Ara-mitama and nigi-mitama
Voodoo doll
, a Rakugo repertoire in which the main character's life and lover both go on ushi no toki mairi

Footnotes

Explanatory notes

Citations

References

 
 
 New Edition of 1883
 
 
 
 
 
 
 
  
 

Japanese folklore
Magic (supernatural)
Shamanism in Japan